Micheline Dax (3 March 1924 – 27 April 2014) was a French film and stage actress and singer. She did the voice to Ursula in the French dub in Disney's "The Little Mermaid".

The Paris-born actress was born Micheline Josette Renée Etevenon. She died on 27 April 2014, aged 90, near Paris.

Filmography

Selected filmography

 Branquignol (1949) .... Aurélie de la Molette
 Rue de l'Estrapade (1953) ... Denise
 Women of Paris (1953) .... La snob indécise
 Ah! Les belles bacchantes (1954) .... Petit rôle (uncredited)
 Pas de souris dans le business (1955)
 La villa Sans-Souci (1955) .... Mme Jarewski
 M'sieur la Caille (1955)
 If Paris Were Told to Us (1956) .... Yvette Guilbert
 Don Juan (1956) .... Doña Elvira
 Short Head (1956) ... Lola d'Héricourt
 The Seventh Commandment (1957) .... La brune remplaçante
 Printemps à Paris (1957)
 Miss Catastrophe (1957) .... Olga
 L'Ami de la famille (1957) .... Tante Zezette
 Ce joli monde (1957) .... Lulu
 Mimi Pinson (1958) .... Madame Louise
 Sacrée jeunesse (1958) .... Mathilde Billard
 The Bureaucrats (1959) .... Gaby
 Love and the Frenchwoman (1960) .... Lulu (segment "Enfance, L'")
 À rebrousse-poil (1961) .... Charlotte
 Le pavé de Paris (1961) .... La fille à la prison
 It's Not My Business (1962) .... Paula
 Six in Paris (1965) .... Prostitute (segment "Rue Saint-Denis")
 Les mordus de Paris (1965)
 A nous deux, Paris! (1966) .... Carmen
 Tender Scoundrel (1966) .... Marjorie
 Le grand bidule (1967) .... Lola Gopec
 Asterix and Cleopatra (1968) .... Cléopâtre (voice)
 La honte de la famille (1969) .... Célestine Maspie
 Ces messieurs de la gâchette (1970) .... La directrice de l'usine
 Tintin and the Lake of Sharks (1972) .... Bianca Castafiore (voice)
 A Slightly Pregnant Man (1973) .... Madame Corfa
 La dernière bourrée à Paris (1973) .... La propriètaire de l'appartement
 Vos gueules les mouettes! (1974) .... Mme Le Marlec
 Flat Out (1975) .... Chantal Moreau
 L'acrobate (1976) .... Mme Lamour
 The Twelve Tasks of Asterix (1976) .... High Priestess (voice)
 Le grand fanfaron (1976) .... La colonelle Popoti
 En cas de guerre mondiale, je file à l'étranger (1983) .... L'animatrice TV
 Lucky Luke (1984-1985, TV Series) .... Calamity Jane (voice)
 The Little Mermaid (1989) .... Ursula (voice)
 Pentimento (1989) .... Christiane
 Les clés du paradis (1991) .... Olga
 La joie de vivre (1993) .... Muguette
 Violetta la reine de la moto (1997) .... Rita
 L'Ex-femme de ma vie (2004) .... Madame Belin
 Max & Co (2008) .... Madame Doudou (voice)
 Park Benches (2009) .... The philosophe
 La femme invisible (d'après une histoire vraie) (2009) .... Mamie

Television
La Vie parisienne (1967) (as Metella), directed by Yves-André Hubert (television version of 1958 stage production by Jean-Louis Barrault).
 Les Monos (2003 - Season 1, Episode 10) ... Germaine

Awards
 1999 Nominated for Molière Award for Best Supporting Actress (Frederick or the Crime Boulevard)
 2004 Nominated for Molière Award for Best Actress (Driving Miss Daisy)

References

External links

1924 births
2014 deaths
Actresses from Paris
French film actresses
French stage actresses
French voice actresses
Chevaliers of the Légion d'honneur
Commandeurs of the Ordre des Arts et des Lettres